Dainya yogas, along with Khala yogas, Mantreswara in his Phaladeepika (vide verses VI.32-34) states, are inauspicious planetary combinations. Those born with Dainya yogas emerge as fools i.e. not intelligent, they insult and speak ill of others, they are bad in conduct and behaviour, suffer at the hands of their opponents or foes, are of unsteady mind whose own actions create hurdles and problems in all works commenced by them. Those born with Khala yogas exhibit good and bad traits in their conduct, speech and behaviour; and also experience good fortune and bad fortune, both. Dainya yogas and Khala yogas affect good fortune and prosperity; They harm people. In the event of these yogas occurring the evil bhavas flourish because of the lord of their lords occupying good houses but these inauspicious yogas prove detrimental to the affairs of the auspicious bhava the lords of evil bhavas occupy. Dainya yogas are worse than Khala yogas. By permutation and combination the lord of the 12th mutually exchanging sign with the lords of the 6th and the 8th causes eleven Dainya yogas, the lord of the 8th with the lords of the 6th and the 12th, ten Dainya yogas, and the lord of the 6th with the lords of the 8th and the 12th, nine Dainya yogas. 

In the Parashari system of Hindu astrology a sign is equal to a bhava or house. Planets involved in mutual exchange of signs or Parivartana yoga i.e. each occupy the other's house, give rise to auspicious and inauspicious yogas. The mutual exchange of signs between lords of favourable bhavas viz the lords of the 2nd, the kendras, the trikonas and the 11th bhava, produce twenty-eight auspicious yogas known as Maha yogas; those born with Maha yogas are most fortunate and wealthy. The mutual exchange of the lords of these bhavas with the lord of the 3rd give rise to eight inauspicious Khala yogas but the lords of the 6th, the 8th and the 12th, which are known as the Trika bhavas, as involved between themselves and all other bhava-lords give rise to thirty very inauspicious Dainya yogas.

However, Kalidasa in his Uttara Kalamrita (vide verse IV.22) offers a slightly differing view; he states that mutual exchange of signs between the lords of the 6th, the 8th and the 12th confer good results provided they are not associated with the lords of other bhavas by way of conjunction or aspect, when they cause Viparita Raja yoga. 

Dainya yoga is one of the type of parivartan yoga.

References

Yogas